Suraphol Nitikraipot is a Thai professor of law, rector of Thammasat University, and an appointed member of the Thai military junta's National Legislative Assembly.

Education 
Suraphol graduated with second class honors in law from Thammasat University in 1982, a Diplome d'Etudes Approfondies in public law from Université Robert Schuman in 1987, and a Doctorat (Mention très honorable) from Université Robert Schuman in 1990.

Academic career 
Suraphol rose rapidly in the Thammasat University bureaucracy. In 1983, after just graduating with his bachelor's degree, he became Associate Dean of the Faculty of Law. In 1991, after graduating with his doctorate, he became assistant to the Deputy Rector of Treasury and Assets. In 1995, he was in charge of construction of the Asian Games sports center at Thammasat's Rangsit campus.  In 1999, he was in charge of contracting the construction of the Sociology Faculty buildings. From 1998 to 2003, he was head of the University's Asset Management Office.  He was Dean of the Faculty of Law from 2001 to 2004.

Appointment to the National Legislative Assembly
A military coup overthrew the elected government of Prime Minister Thaksin Shinawatra.  The junta abrogated the constitution and abolished Parliament. It established a National Legislative Assembly, consisting of junta-appointees. Suraphol was personally appointed to the Assembly.

"Amy" Chotiros Suriyawong
Thammasat University arts senior "Amy" Chotiros Suriyawong wore a black dress during the 2007 Subhanahongsa Awards viewed by many as being highly sexy.  Her dress proved extremely controversial.  The owner of Sahamongkol Film ordered all footage of Chotiros to be deleted from one of his movies.  The Ministry of Culture called her dress "very inappropriate." However, Amy was also supported by many, some of which resented the military junta's morality drive.

Suraphol forced Amy to appear before a press conference along with her dress and the deans of the university, and made her apologize for her actions.  She was warned that the University might deny her a diploma.  He also punished her by forcing her to read books to blind children for 15 days, as well as perform other community services.  Suraphol noted that "Society feels this is a disgrace and her actions have affected the reputation of this university."

See also
 Sonthi Boonyaratkalin
 Surayud Chulanont
 2007 Constitution of Thailand

References

Further reading
 A selection of Suraphol's publications

Suraphol Nitikraipot
Living people
Year of birth missing (living people)
Suraphol Nitikraipot
Suraphol Nitikraipot
Suraphol Nitikraipot
University of Strasbourg alumni
Suraphol Nitikraipot